Acornhoek, commonly known as Khenhuk, is a semi-rural town situated in the north eastern areas of Bushbuckridge in the Mpumalanga province of South Africa.

Established in the late 1950s, the town is located about 38 km south-east of Hoedspruit in Limpopo and 165 km north-west of Komatipoort near the border post of Mozambique and eSwatini. The name Acornhoek is variously explained as being an adaptation of Eekhoornhoek ('squirrel corner'); derived from the German surname Eichhorn, and named after the acorn-like fruits of the marula tree.

The main languages spoken in Acornhoek are Sepulana and Xitsonga. The Vatsonga occupy the eastern side of the township while most of Mapulana people are settled on the western and southern areas of the township.

Entertainment 
The town has several places of entertainment which are capable of entertaining people, venues include:

 Quiet Vibes/Anjos Square
 The Village Guest House
 La Zara Resort
 Lebogang Bar Lounge
 Dela Casa Pub and Grill
 Bheksisa Pub and Grill
 LOA
 The City Kgabe Park
 Meropa Lodge

The town is currently being recognized by several artists who are booked to perform at these various entertainment venues. Acornhoek has produced and is home to industry stalwarts like SABC radio producer Xolani Wale Khenhuk, TV personality Penny Lebyane, International footballer Rhulani Manzini, Industry specialist Prince Kgoedi, Miss Mpumalanga 2021 Claude Mashego, SATMA Winner MissKay Chardnah, Entertainment blogger McKing Ngobeni and Celebrity Financial Guru Nicolette Mashile.

Commercial activity 
There are three main commercial areas in this rural township namely; Acornhoek CBD, Acornhoek Plaza and Acornhoek mall.

At these areas residents are able to access banks, grocery shops like SuperSpar, Game, Shoprite, Roots Butchery, clothing outlets, take-away franchises and many others.

The town has one public hospital, Tintswalo Hospital. Tintswalo Hospital was built in the 1930s and it is one of the largest medical facility in Bushbuckridge sub-region. Several residents from as far as Phalaborwa in the Limpopo province also visits the hospital.

There is one police station in the township and a Magistrate's Court. Ehlanzeni FET College is one of the most popular areas in the township which attracts a lot of students from various areas across the country.

Acornhoek is also home to the regional offices of Bushbuckridge Local Municipality, and also a small traffic police department.

Public transport is by  mini-bus or taxi and bus. The nearest airport is Eastgate Airport which is about 25km away from the township.

Airport transfers and sightseeing tours are offered from the Eastgate Airport. There are several fuel filling stations in the township which among others includes BP Garage, Swift and Puma.

Notable Brands 
 R FM 103.2, radio station
 Haii Suka Clothing, apparel company
 Top Class Shandis, apparel company
 SWHANCHA, lifestyle brand
 Amanga Clothing, apparel company
 Daz D, apparel company
 Amigo Jeans, apparel company

Sporting 
Football is currently the main sport dominating communities of Acornhoek with no other sport being developed in the area. Teams like Happy Dam, Juventus, Zilla Spurs, White Hill, Score Rangers, Dynamos, All Blacks, Mhandzi, Burkina Faso amongst others, still exist and compete in different regional competitions. Several trials have been made to establish other sporting codes but have failed due to lack of continued support. In the late 2000s, Vincent Mathebula introduced cricket to young prospects but insufficient resources forced them to abandon the initiative.

Acornhoek News 
Acornhoek News is an online news publication focusing on events that happen on the area and other issues of  interest. The publication first went live during community unrests in 2018 as updates were posted on their Facebook page which subsequently became their primary publishing platform. The publication was welcomed by readers and became a source of local news for many. Their successful run sparked interest of print media hence causing tension with other subjects. The publication page was later purchased by Brand Acornhoek.

Brand Acornhoek 
Seeing the need to provide development support, a group of individuals hailing from Acornhoek gathered and resolved to establish Brand Acornhoek, a marketing and development platform that also serves as a lobby organisation.

The initiative also runs Corporate Social Investments gigs for local businesses using the Miss Acornhoek Foundation ambassadors as project faces. The organisation is yet to crown the official Miss Acornhoek after many delays and controversial crowning of the 2017 winner.

The 2017 competition was cancelled due to the results being rigged and organisers are yet to host the official edition.

Accommodation 
Accommodation is available in B&B's, Lodges, Guest Houses, and nearby private game reserves: Hoyo-Hoyo lodge, Secret Hill and Timbavati Game Reserve to name a few. For nature and wildlife attractions, one can access the Kruger National Park through the Orpen gate entrance that is 39 km away, Manyeleti Game Reserve which is 49 km away, or Blyde River Canyon which is 50 km away.

References

Populated places in the Bushbuckridge Local Municipality